The Chicago Conservatory College — not to be confused with The Music Conservatory of Chicago College of Performing Arts — was a music school specialized in advanced levels (or tertiary levels) of musical education based in Chicago, Illinois in the United States of America, which operated between 1857 and 1981. According to a letter written in 1997 by the Board of Higher Education, the college was in good standing at the time of closure.

It was founded by musician and composer Robert Goldbeck (1839–1908) in 1857 and is claimed to be the first music conservatory in the US. It preceded the Oberlin Conservatory of Music - which is today considered the oldest continuously operating conservatory in the United States - and the Chicago Academy of Music (claimed the fourth music conservatory in America) which were founded in 1865 and 1867 respectively.

The Chicago Conservatory College is mentioned among present Chicago Academy of Music, the American Conservatory of Music, the Sherwood Music School, Northwestern, DePaul, Roosevelt University and the University of Chicago in an overview of the music history of the city of Chicago.

It is likely that the music school was founded under a different name, which was eventually changed into The Chicago Conservatory College

References 

Music schools in Illinois
Universities and colleges in Chicago
Defunct private universities and colleges in Illinois
1857 establishments in Illinois